Bison occidentalis is an extinct species of bison that lived in North America, and in continental Eurasia and the Japanese archipelago from about 11,700 to 5,000 years ago, spanning the end of the Pleistocene to the mid-Holocene.

Characteristics
Likely evolving from Bison antiquus, B. occidentalis was smaller overall from its most direct ancestor, but was similar to the distant ancestor the steppe bison (Bison priscus) in size. B. occidentalis had a highly variable morphology, and their horns, which pointed rearward, were much thinner and pointed than other Pleistocene species of bison.

B. occidentalis, like other bison species, may have existed in small, scattered populations and been unable to increase in numbers until after the Pleistocene epoch ended 10,000 years ago because of competition with other large grazers during the Pleistocene.

Evolution
B. occidentalis'''s decrease in size from Bison antiquus was likely caused by both human hunting and natural selection. The smaller size likely helped B. occidentalis increase in population after migrating into North America. As Bison antiquus was forced to lived on open grasslands and faced pressure from human hunting, it responded by downsizing into B. occidentalis. Hybridization of these two bison species produced the modern American bison Bison bison, which further decreased body size and increased population. The wood bison (Bison bison athabascae) preserves some original traits of B. occidentalis which was more similar to the ancestral steppe bison, making the wood bison more primitive than the plains bison (Bison bison bison).

More recently ancient DNA studies have proven interbreeding between B. occidentalis and Bison bison, so B. occidentalis was proposed to have been a localized offshoot of B. antiquus and part of the transition from that chronospecies to modern bison.

See also
 Great bison belt
 Steppe bison
 Bison antiquus''
 American bison

References

Bison
Prehistoric bovids
Pleistocene even-toed ungulates
Prehistoric mammals of North America
Holocene extinctions
Fossil taxa described in 1898